Nickelodeon is a Latin American pay television channel, counterpart of the American network of the same name. It is owned by Paramount Networks Americas and was launched on 20 December 1996. Aside from airing Nick and Nick Jr. content, it has produced original programming for the channel and has been sold to local distributors worldwide except for Cuba as cable television is banned in that country.

History 
The channel was launched on 20 December 1996 in Latin America as a children-oriented channel, being the main competitor of Cartoon Network, which was launched three years before. In 1999, Nickelodeon launched its official website for the region, MundoNick.com. "Nick Radio" was also available, but eventually it was replaced by the Nick Jr. official site.

On 13 February 2006, a programming block named Nick at Nite was launched. It consisted mostly of live-action shows from the 80s and 90s, and aired from 10 pm to 6 am.

On 9 June 2008, the channel launched "Nickers", a live-action show with two hosts introducing shows and music. It followed the same line and was very similar to Disney Channel's Zapping Zone. The block was cancelled in all feeds in December 2008. In 2008, two locally produced series premiered, both being soap operas. The first one, Isa TKM premiered on 29 September 2008 and La maga y el camino dorado premiered on 13 October of that same year.

In 2009, a programming block called Nick Hits, which airs classic Nick Toons, replaced Nick at Nite on weekends. On 5 April 2010, Nickelodeon Latin America was rebranded with the new logo already in use in the US and most countries in the world, making it the last Nickelodeon channel worldwide to switch to the new graphics. Due to the rebrand, NickHits was closed down and replaced again by Nick at Nite. In June 2010, Viacom gave the rights for Mexico to release their own Kids Choice Awards. It premiered on 4 September 2010. On 20 July 2010, another original series called Sueña conmigo premiered on the channel.

Through August 2010, Nickelodeon started to rerun the animated series Avatar: The Last Airbender to promote the 2010 film adaptation; with this, a new on-air logo was shown when the series was broadcast, an arrow blurring takes on/off in the Nick logo. On 2 May 2011, it was premiered the fifth original production Grachi. In late January 2012, MTV Networks Latin America announced another locally produced soap opera, Miss XV, that was premiered on 16 April 2012.

Since 2012, the Nick at Nite programming block was no longer airing classic programming from the 80s and 90s and, instead, was a mere relay of Nickelodeon's 2000s and 2010s TV series that were not aired in the main slot anymore.

On 1 January 2015 the Nick at Nite programming block went off the air.

Feeds 
Nickelodeon Latin America is divided into three different feeds for its broadcast in the Latin American region.
 Feed 1: Mexico
 Feed 2: Colombia, Chile, Peru, Central America, Dominican Republic, Venezuela, Ecuador and Bolivia.
 Feed 3: Argentina, Paraguay and Uruguay

Programming

Events and media

Verano Nick
Verano Nick (Nick Summer) is a limited summer event, that holds in different places, such on beaches and hotels. It holds every year since 2007.

Kids' Choice Awards Mexico

In June 2010, Viacom gave the rights for Mexico to release their own Kids' Choice Awards. It was presented on September 4, 2010, in "El Teatro Chino de Six Flags" (The Chinese Theater of Six Flags) on the Six Flags Mexico park. It was presented by Omar Chaparro and Anahí. The show was not show in TV until October 14, 2010.

Kids Choice Awards Argentina

Kids Choice Awards Colombia

Revista Nick

Revista Nick (Nick Magazine) was launched on 27 November 2004 in Mexico, ending in April 2010, five months after the American version was ended due to the continued migration of network content to the Internet.

Website
MundoNick.com was the name of the network's official website which launched in 1999. In 2020, MundoNick.com was closed in favor of a new site for the network called Nickelodeon.la.

Sister channels

Nickelodeon HD

In September 2010, MTV Networks Latin America announced new plans for 2011, one of them, the launching of Nickelodeon HD officially MTV Live HD. In May 2011, MTV Networks Latin America announced more details. Programming would be American and local. The HD channel launched on June 1, 2011, all over Latin America.

Nickelodeon HD starting simulcasting the main channel on December 17, 2015, and on August 1, 2016, the original HD channel was renamed Nick 2.

Nick Jr.

Nick Jr. is a cable television channel in Latin America owned by Viacom that was launched in July 2008 as a 24-hour channel. Aimed at preschool audience. Originally, it was a block on Nickelodeon from 1997 to 2017.

Nicktoons

On January 29, 2013, it was announced that a Nicktoons channel would launch in Latin America. It started airing on February 4, 2013, on television providers Cablevisión, Megacable and Cablecom.
The channel was replaced by the US feed of NickMusic in many cable providers by the end of 2020 and later was shut down as of December 2020.

NickMusic

NickMusic starting simulcasting their US feed on September 1, 2020, replacing VH1 MegaHits and Nicktoons in select Latin America countries. The first music video played on the channel was "Dynamite" by BTS.

TeenNick

TeenNick (formerly Nick 2) is a commercial-free secondary channel of Nickelodeon. It replaced Nick 2 on September 14, 2020.

References

External links 

Latin America
Television channels and stations established in 1996
Spanish-language television stations
1996 establishments in South America